Jake Polledri (born 8 November 1995) is an English-born rugby union player who plays for the Italy national rugby union team and for Gloucester Rugby in Premiership Rugby.

Early life
Polledri attended The Downs Preparatory School, Bristol until the age of 13. He had a brother. Whilst at The Downs Polledri was a member of the victorious 2009 National Schools 7’s winning side, beating Bedford School to become National Champions. After leaving The Downs Preparatory School in 2009, Polledri enrolled at Colston's School, Bristol. Afterwards Polledri moved to Filton College, Bristol. He represented Filton College and Dings Crusaders, in addition to turning out in the Aviva Premiership A League for Bristol Rugby since 2014.
He played junior rugby for St Mary's Old Boys.

Club career
He then joined Hartpury RFC during the 2015-16 season where at senior level, during the 2016-17 season, he had a breakthrough campaign as he has played his part in a season for the runaway leaders in National League 1, where he helped them earn promotion to the RFU Championship.

On 2 March 2017, Polledri signed his first professional contract with Gloucester Rugby in Premiership Rugby, which is a three-year deal ahead of the 2017-18 season. In December 2017, he was awarded Try of the week for his try in Round 10 against London Irish. He also won Gloucester Rugby’s Young Player of the Season Award for the 2017-18 season and the Player of the Season for the 2019-20 season.

After suffering a serious knee ligament injury that led Polledri out of action for nearly 18 months, he has signed a contract extension to stay with Gloucester for the 2022-23 season. 

In March 2023, Gloucester Rugby confirmed that Pollledri would depart the club at the end of the 2022-23 season to join Zebre.

International career
Polledri qualified for Italy through Italian grandparents and represented Italy U20s during the 2014 IRB Junior World Championship.

On 17 March 2018, Polledri made his international debut for Italy, losing 27–29 against Scotland in their final match of the 2018 Six Nations Championship.
On 16 June 2018, Polledri scored his first international try for Italy in a game against Japan which the Italians won 25–22.

References

External links

Gloucester Rugby Profile

Living people
1995 births
Rugby union players from Bristol
Gloucester Rugby players
Italian rugby union players
Italy international rugby union players
Rugby union flankers